The 2022 Vietnamese Football League Second Division (known as the ALPHA Cup for sponsorship reasons) was the 22nd season of the Vietnam League Two. The regular season began on 18 April and ended on 3 June. The final stage was played on 8 May, with Binh Thuan and Hoa Binh gaining promotion to the 2023 V.League 2.

Teams

Stadium and locations

Note: Table lists in alphabetical order.

Number of teams by region

Personnel and kits

Group stage

Group A

Table

Results

Group B

Table

Results

Ranking of last-placed teams 
<onlyinclude>

<onlyinclude>

Final stage
 

Binh Thuan and Hoa Binh are promoted to V. League 2.

References

2022 in Vietnamese football